

M

Ma 

 

 

 
 

Macaulayite (IMA1981-062) 9.EC.65   
Macdonaldite (rhodesite: IMA1964-010) 9.EB.05   
Macedonite (oxide perovskite: IMA1970-010) 4.CC.35    (IUPAC: lead titanium trioxide)
Macfallite (IMA1974-057) 9.BG.15    (IUPAC: dicalcium trimanganese(III) tetraoxysilicate heptaoxodisilicate trihydroxyl)
Machatschkiite (IMA1976-010) 8.CJ.35    (IUPAC: hexacalcium arsenate tri(hydroxoarsenate) phosphate pentadecahydrate)
Machiite (schreyerite: IMA2016-067) 4.0  [no] [no] (IUPAC: dialuminium trititanium nonaoxide)
Mackayite (Y: 1944) 4.JL.10    (IUPAC: iron(III) hydro ditellurium(IV) pentaoxide)
Mackinawite (IMA1967 s.p., 1964) 2.CC.25   
Macphersonite (IMA1982-105) 5.BF.40    (IUPAC: tetralead dihydro sulfate dicarbonate)
Macquartite (IMA1979-037) 9.HH.05    (IUPAC: dicopper heptalead tetrachromate di(tetraoxysilicate) dihydroxyl)
Madeiraite (wöhlerite: IMA2021-077)  [no] [no]
Madocite (madocite: IMA1966-015) 2.LB.30   
Magadiite (IMA1967-017) 9.EA.20   
Magbasite (IMA1968 s.p., 1965) 9.HA.25   
Magganasite (IMA2021-112) 8.BN.  [no] [no]
MaghagendorfiteQ (alluaudite: IMA19 s.p., IMA1979 s.p.) 8.AC.10   
Maghemite (spinel: 1927) 4.BB.15    (((Fe3+)0.67◻0.33)(Fe3+)2O4)
Maghrebite (laueite, laueite: IMA2005-044) 8.DC.30   [no] (IUPAC: magnesium dialuminium dihydro diarsenate octahydrate)
Magnanelliite (alcaparrosaite: IMA2019-006) 7.0  [no] [no] (IUPAC: tripotassium diiron(III) hydro tetrasulfate diwater)
Magnéliite (IMA2021-111) 4.BB.  [no] [no] (IUPAC: dititanium(III) dititanium(IV) heptaoxide)
Magnesioalterite (alterite: IMA2020-050)  [no] [no]
Magnesio-arfvedsonite [Na-amphibole: IMA2013-137, IMA2012 s.p., 1957] 9.DE.25    
Magnesioaubertite (aubertite: IMA1982-015) 7.DB.05    (IUPAC: magnesium aluminium chloro disulfate tetradecahydrate)
Magnesiobeltrandoite-2N3S (högbomite: IMA2016-073) 4.0  [no] [no]
Magnesiobermanite (arthurite: IMA2018-115) 8.0  [no] [no] (IUPAC: magnesium dimanganese(III) dihydro diphosphate tetrahydrate)
Magnesiocanutite (alluaudite: IMA2016-057) 8.0  [no] [no] (IUPAC: sodium vacancy magnesium dimanganese diarsenate dihydroxoarsenate)
Magnesiocarpholite (carpholite: IMA1978-027) 9.DB.05    (IUPAC: magnesium dialuminium hexaoxydisilicate tetrahydroxyl)
Magnesiochloritoid (IMA1987-J, 1983) 9.AF.85    (IUPAC: magnesium dialuminium oxy(tetraoxysilicate) dihydroxyl)
Magnesiochlorophoenicite (chlorophoenicite: IMA1981 s.p., 1935 Rd) 8.BE.35   
Magnesiochromite (spinel, spinel: 1873) 4.BB.05    (IUPAC: magnesium dichromium(III) tetraoxide)
Magnesiocopiapite (copiapite: 1939) 7.DB.35    (IUPAC: magnesium tetrairon(III) dihydro hexasulfate icosahydrate)
Magnesiocoulsonite (spinel, spinel: IMA1994-034) 4.BB.05    (IUPAC: magnesium divanadium tetraoxide)
Magnesiodumortierite (dumortierite: IMA1992-050 Rd) 9.AJ.10   [no]
Magnesio-ferri-fluoro-hornblende [Ca-amphibole: IMA2014-091] 9.D  [no] [no]
Magnesio-ferri-hornblende [Ca-amphibole: IMA2021-100] 9.DE.10  [no] [no]
Magnesioferrite (spinel, spinel: 1859) 4.BB.05    (IUPAC: magnesium diiron(III) tetraoxide)
Magnesiofluckite (fluckite: IMA2017-103) 8.0  [no] [no] (IUPAC: calcium magnesium di(hydroxoarsenate) diwater)
Magnesio-fluoro-arfvedsonite [Na-amphibole: IMA2012 s.p., fluoromagnesioarfvedsonite (IMA1998-056)] 9.DE.25   [no]
Magnesio-fluoro-hastingsite [Ca-amphibole: IMA2012 s.p., fluoro-magnesiohastingsite (IMA2005-002)] 9.DE.15   
Magnesiofoitite (tourmaline: IMA1998-037 Rd) 9.CK.05   [no]
Magnesio-hastingsite [Ca-amphibole: IMA2012 s.p., IMA1997 s.p., magnesiohastingsite (1928)] 9.DE.15   
Magnesiohatertite (alluaudite: IMA2016-078) 8.0  [no] [no]
Magnesiohögbomite (högbomite, magnesiohögbomite) 4.CB.20
Magnesiohögbomite-2N2S (IMA2001 s.p., 1916 Rd) 4.CB.20   
Magnesiohögbomite-2N3S (IMA2001 s.p., 1963 Rd) 4.CB.20   [no]
Magnesiohögbomite-2N4S (IMA2010-084) 4.CB.20  [no] 
Magnesiohögbomite-6N6S (IMA2001 s.p., 1990 Rd) 4.CB.20   [no]
Magnesio-hornblende [Ca-amphibole: IMA2017-059, IMA2012 s.p., IMA1997 s.p., magnesiohornblende (1965)] 9.DE.10   
Magnesiohulsite (hulsite: IMA1983-074) 6.AB.45   
Magnesiokoritnigite (koritnigite: IMA2013-049) 8.0  [no] [no] (IUPAC: magnesium hydroxoarsenate monohydrate)
Magnesioleydetite (leydetite: IMA2017-063) 7.0  [no] [no] (IUPAC: magnesium uranyl disulfate undecahydrate)
Magnesio-lucchesiite (tourmaline: IMA2019-025) 9.CK.  [no] [no]
Magnesioneptunite (neptunite: IMA2009-009) 9.EH.05  [no] [no]
Magnesionigerite (nigerite, magnesionigerite) 4.FC.20
Magnesionigerite-2N1S (IMA2001 s.p., IMA1988-010) 4.FC.20   
Magnesionigerite-6N6S (IMA2001 s.p., 1989) 4.FC.20   [no]
Magnesiopascoite (pascoite: IMA2007-025) 4.HC.05   
Magnesio-riebeckite [Na-amphibole: IMA2012 s.p., IMA1997 s.p., magnesioriebeckite (1957)] 9.DE.25   
Magnesiorowlandite-(Y) (rowlandite: IMA2012-010) 9.H?.  [no]  (IUPAC: tetrayttrium (magnesium,iron) difluoro di(heptadisilicate))
Magnesiostaurolite (IMA1992-035) 9.AF.30   [no]
Magnesiotaaffeite (taaffeite, magnesiotaaffeite) 04.FC.25
Magnesiotaaffeite-2N2S (IMA2001 s.p., 1951) 4.FC.25   [no] (IUPAC: trimagnesium beryllium octaluminium hexadecaoxide)
Magnesiotaaffeite-6N3S (IMA2001 s.p., IMA1966-041) 4.FC.25    (IUPAC: dimagnesium beryllium hexaluminium dodecaoxide)
Magnesiovesuvianite (vesuvianite: IMA2015-104) 9.BG.  [no] [no]
Magnesiovoltaite (voltaite: IMA2015–095) 7.0  [no] [no]
Magnesiozippeite (zippeite: IMA1971-007 Rd) 7.EC.05   
Magnesite (calcite: IMA1962 s.p., 1808) 5.AB.05    (IUPAC: magnesium carbonate)
Magnetite (spinel, spinel: 1789) 4.BB.05    (IUPAC: iron(II) diiron(III) tetraoxide)
Magnetoplumbite (magnetoplumbite: 1925) 4.CC.45    (IUPAC: lead dodecairon(III) nonadecaoxide)
Magnioursilite (ursilite: 1957) 9.AK.35  [no] [no] (IUPAC: tetramagnesio tetrauranyl penta(pentaoxydisilicate) hexahydroxyl icosahydrate)
Magnolite (tellurite: 1878) 4.JK.60    (IUPAC: (dimercury) tellurite)
Magnussonite (IMA1984 s.p., 1957 Rd) 4.JB.15   
Mahnertite (IMA1994-035) 8.DH.45    (IUPAC: (sodium, calcium, potassium) tricopper chloro diarsenate pentahydrate)
Maikainite (germanite: IMA1992-038) 2.CB.30    (IUPAC: decacopper triiron molybdenum trigermanide hexadecasulfide)
Majakite (IMA1974-038) 2.AC.25e    (IUPAC: palladium nickel arsenide)
Majindeite (nolanite: IMA2012-079) 4.CB.40  [no] [no] (IUPAC: dimagnesium trimolybdenum octaoxide)
Majorite (garnet, garnet: IMA1969-018) 9.AD.25    (IUPAC: trimagnesio (magnesiosilicon) tri(tetraoxysilicate))
Majzlanite (IMA2018-016) 7.0  [no] [no] (IUPAC: dipotassium sodium (zinc sodium) calcium tetrasulfate)
Makarochkinite (sapphirine: IMA2002-009a) 9.DH.40   [no]
Makatite (IMA1969-003) 9.EE.45    (IUPAC: disodium octaoxy tetrasilicate dihydroxyl tetrahydrate)
Mäkinenite (millerite: IMA1967 s.p., 1964) 2.CC.20    (IUPAC: nickel selenide)
Makotoite (IMA2020-071) 2.0  [no] [no]
Makovickyite (pavonite: IMA1986-027) 2.JA.05d   
Malachite (malachite: 1747) 5.BA.10    (IUPAC: dicopper dihydro carbonate)
Malanite (spinel, linnaeite: IMA1995-003) 2.DA.05    (Cu1+(Ir3+Pt4+)S4)
Malayaite (titanite: IMA1964-024) 9.AG.15    (IUPAC: calcium tin oxytetraoxysilicate)
Maldonite (metalloid alloy: 1870) 2.AA.40    (IUPAC: digold bismuthide)
Maleevite (danburite: IMA2002-027) 9.FA.65    (IUPAC: barium octaoxy diboro disilicate)
Maletoyvayamite (IMA2019-021) 2.0  [no] [no] (IUPAC: trigold tetraselenide hexatelluride)
Malhmoodite (IMA2002-D, IMA1992-001) 8.CE.75    (IUPAC: iron(II) zirconium diphosphate tetrahydrate)
Malinkoite (beryllonite: IMA2000-009) 9.FA.10   [no] (IUPAC: sodium tetraoxy borosilicate)
Malladrite (fluorosilicate: 1926) 3.CH.05    (IUPAC: disodium hexafluorosilicate)
Mallardite (melanterite: 1879) 7.CB.35    (IUPAC: manganese(II) sulfate heptahydrate)
Mallestigite (fleischerite: IMA1996-043) 7.DF.25    (IUPAC: trilead antimony hexahydro sulfate arsenate trihydrate)
Malyshevite (IMA2006-012) 2.GA.25   [no] (IUPAC: palladium copper trisulfa bismuthide)
Mambertiite (gelosaite: IMA2013-098) 4.0  [no] [no] (BiMoO8(OH))
Mammothite (IMA1983-076a) 7.BC.60   
Manaevite-(Ce) (vesuvianite: IMA2018-046) 9.BG.  [no] [no]
Manaksite (litidionite: IMA1990-024) 9.DG.70    (IUPAC: potassium sodium manganese(II) decaoxy tetrasilicate)
Manandonite (serpentine: 1912) 9.ED.15    (IUPAC: dilithium tetraluminium decaoxy (boroaluminodisilicate) octahydroxyl)
Mandarinoite (mandarinoite: IMA1977-049) 4.JH.15    (IUPAC: diiron(III) triselenite hexahydrate)
Maneckiite (wicksite: IMA2015-056) 8.0  [no] [no]
Manganarsite (IMA1985-037) 4.JB.10    (IUPAC: trimanganese(II) tetrahydro diarsenic(III) tetraoxide)
Manganbabingtonite (rhodonite: IMA1971 s.p., 1966) 9.DK.05   
ManganbelyankiniteQ (Y: 1957) 4.FM.25   
Manganberzeliite (garnet: 1878) 8.AC.25    (IUPAC: (sodium dicalcium) dimanganese(II) triarsenate)
ManganeseD (Y: 2001) 1.AE.30  [no] [no]
Manganflurlite (flurlite: IMA2017-076) 8.0  [no] [no]
Mangangordonite (laueite, laueite: IMA1989-023) 8.DC.30    (IUPAC: manganese dialuminium dihydro diphosphate octahydrate)
Manganhumite (humite: IMA1969-021) 9.AF.50    (IUPAC: heptamanganese(II) tri(tetraoxysilicate) dihydroxyl)
Manganiakasakaite-(La) (epidote: IMA2017-028) 9.B?.  [no] [no]
Manganiandrosite (epidote, allanite) 9.BG.05
Manganiandrosite-(Ce) (IMA2002-049) 9.BG.05   
Manganiandrosite-(La) (IMA1994-048) 9.BG.05b   [no]
Manganiceladonite (mica: IMA2015-052) 9.E?.  [no] [no]
Mangani-dellaventuraite [O-dominant amphibole: IMA2012 s.p., dellaventuraite (IMA2003-061)] 9.DE.25   [no]
Manganilvaite (ilvaite: IMA2002-016) 9.BE.07    (IUPAC: calcium iron(II) iron(III) manganese(II) heptaoxodisilicate oxohydroxyl)
Mangani-obertiite [O-dominant amphibole: IMA2014 s.p., ferri-obertiite (IMA2012 s.p.), obertiite (IMA1998-046)] 9.DE.25   [no]
Mangani-pargasite (Ca-amphibole: IMA2018-151) 9.D?.  [no] [no] 
Manganite ("O(OH)" group: 1826) 4.FD.15    (IUPAC: hydromanganese(III) oxide)
Manganlotharmeyerite (tsumcorite: IMA2001-026) 8.CG.15    (IUPAC: calcium dimanganese(III) dihydro diarsenate)
Manganoarrojadite-(KNa) (arrojadite: IMA2020-003) 8.0  [no] [no]
Manganobadalovite (alluaudite: IMA2020-035)  [no] [no]
Manganoblödite (blödite: IMA2012-029) 7.C?.  [no] [no] (IUPAC: disodium managanese disulfate tetrahydrate)
Manganochromite (spinel, spinel: IMA1975-020) 4.BB.05    (IUPAC: manganese(II) dichromium tetraoxide)
Manganoeudialyte (eudialyte: IMA2009-039) 9.CO.10  [no] 
Mangano-ferri-eckermannite [Na-amphibole: IMA2012 s.p., kôzulite (IMA1968-028)] 9.DE.25   
Manganohörnesite (vivianite: IMA2007 s.p., 1951) 8.CE.40    (IUPAC: trimanganese(II) diarsenate octahydrate)
Manganokaskasite (valleriite: IMA2013-026) 2.0  [no] 
Manganokhomyakovite (eudialyte: IMA1998-043) 9.CO.10   [no]
Manganokukisvumite (IMA2002-029) 9.DB.20   
Manganolangbeinite (langbeinite: 1926) 7.AC.10    (IUPAC: dipotassium dimanganese(II) trisulfate)
Mangano-mangani-ungarettiite [O-dominant amphibole: IMA2012 s.p., ungarettiite (IMA1994-004)] 9.DE.25   [no]
Manganonaujakasite (IMA1999-031) 9.EG.10   [no]
Manganoneptunite (neptunite: IMA2007 s.p., 1923) 9.EH.05   
Manganonordite-(Ce) (nordite: IMA1997-007) 9.DO.15   [no]
Manganoquadratite (quadratite: IMA2011-008) 2.GC.25  [no] [no] (IUPAC: silver manganese trisulfa arsenide)
Manganosegelerite (overite: IMA1984-055) 8.DH.20    (IUPAC: dimanganese(II) iron(III) hydro diphosphate tetrahydrate)
ManganoshadluniteN (Y: 1973) 2.BB.15  [no] 
Manganosite (rocksalt, periclase: 1874) 4.AB.25    (IUPAC: manganese(II) oxide)
Manganostibite (Y: 1884) 4.BA.10    (IUPAC: heptamanganese(II) antimony(V) arsenic(V) dodecaoxide)
Manganotychite (northupite: IMA1989-039) 5.BF.05    (IUPAC: hexasodium dimanganese(II) tetracarbonate sulfate)
Manganvesuvianite (vesuvianite: IMA2000-040) 9.BG.35   [no]
Mangazeite (IMA2005-021a) 7.DE.05    (IUPAC: dialuminium tetrahydro sulfate trihydrate)
Manitobaite (alluaudite: IMA2008-064) 8.AC.18  [no] [no] (IUPAC: hexadecasodium pentacosamanganese(II) octaluminium tricontaphosphate)
Manjiroite (hollandite, coronadite: IMA1966-009) 4.DK.05a   
Mannardite (hollandite, coronadite: IMA1983-013) 4.DK.05b   
Mansfieldite (Y: 1948) 8.CD.10    (IUPAC: aluminium arsenate dihydrate)
Mantienneite (IMA1983-048) 8.DH.35    (IUPAC: potassium dimagnesium dialuminium titanium trihydro tetraphosphate pentadecahydrate)
Maohokite (post-spinel: IMA2017-047) 4.0  [no] [no] (IUPAC: magnesium diiron tetraoxide)
Maoniupingite-(Ce) (chevkinite: IMA2003-017) 9.BE.70   [no]
Mapimite (IMA1978-070) 8.DC.55    (IUPAC: dizinc triiron(III) tetrahydro triarsenate decahydrate)
Mapiquiroite (crichtonite: IMA2013-010) 4.0  [no] [no]
Marathonite (IMA2016-080) 2.0  [no] [no] (Pd25Ge9)
Marcasite (marcasite: 1751) 2.EB.10a    (IUPAC: iron disulfide)
Marchettiite (IMA2017-066) 10.0  [no] [no] (IUPAC: ammonium hydrogen urate)
Marcobaldiite (geocronite: IMA2015-109) 2.0  [no] [no]
Marécottite (IMA2001-056) 7.EC.15    (IUPAC: trimagnesium hexaoxo octauranyl dihydro tetrasulfate octacosahydrate)
Margaritasite (IMA1980-093) 4.HB.05    (IUPAC: dicesium diuranyl divanadate monohydrate)
Margarite (mica: IMA1998 s.p., 1821) 9.EC.30    (IUPAC: calcium dialuminium dialuminodisilicate decaoxydihydroxyl)
Margarosanite (Y: 1916) 9.CA.25    (IUPAC: dicalcium lead nonaoxy trisilicate)
Mariakrite (hydrotalcite: IMA2021-097)
Marialite (scapolite: 1866) 9.FB.15   
Marićite (IMA1976-024) 8.AC.20    (IUPAC: sodium iron(II) phosphate)
Maricopaite (zeolitic tectosilicate: IMA1985-036) 9.GD.35   
Mariinskite (olivine: IMA2011-057) 4.B?.  [no]  (IUPAC: dichromium beryllium tetraoxide)
Marinaite (ludwigite: IMA2016-021) 6.0  [no] [no] (IUPAC: dicopper iron(III) dioxoborate)
Marinellite (cancrinite-sodalite: IMA2002-021) 9.FB.05   [no]
Markascherite (IMA2010-051) 7.G?.  [no] [no] (IUPAC: tricopper tetrahydro molybdate)
Markcooperite (uranyl-tellurium oxysalt: IMA2009-045) 7.E?.  [no] [no] (IUPAC: dilead uranyl tellurium hexaoxide)
Markeyite (markeyite: IMA2016-090) 5.0  [no] [no] (IUPAC: nonacalcium tetrauranyl tridecacarbonate octacosahydrate)
Markhininite (IMA2012-040) 7.0  [no] [no] (IUPAC: thallium bismuth disulfate)
Marklite (IMA2015-101) 5.0  [no] [no] (IUPAC: pentacopper hexahydro dicarbonate hexahydrate)
Marokite (post-spinel: IMA1963-005) 4.BC.05    (IUPAC: calcium dimanganese(III) tetraoxide)
Marrite (Y: 1905) 2.JB.15    (IUPAC: silver lead trisulfa arsenide)
Marrucciite (IMA2006-015) 2.JB.60   [no] (Hg3Pb16Sb18S46)
Marshite (sphalerite: 1892) 3.AA.05    (IUPAC: copper iodide)
Marsturite (rhodonite: IMA1977-047) 9.DK.05   
Marthozite (IMA1968-016) 4.JJ.05    (IUPAC: copper(II) triuranyl dioxo diselenite octahydrate)
Martinandresite (zeolitic tectosilicate: IMA2017-038) 9.G?  [no] [no]
Martinite (gyrolite: IMA2001-059) 9.EE.80   [no]
Martyite (volborthite: IMA2007-026) 8.FD.05    (IUPAC: trizinc dihydro pyrovanadate dihydrate)
Marumoite (IMA1998-004) 2.HC.05g   [no] (Pb32As40S92)
Maruyamaite (tourmaline: IMA2013-123) 9.CK.  [no] [no]
Mascagnite (arcanite: 1777) 7.AD.05    (IUPAC: diammonium sulfate)
Maslovite (pyrite: IMA1978-002) 2.EB.25    (IUPAC: platinum bismuthide telluride)
Massicot (Y: 1841) 4.AC.25    (IUPAC: lead oxide)
Masutomilite (mica: IMA1974-046) 9.EC.20   
Masuyite (Y: 1947) 4.GB.35    (IUPAC: lead triuranyl dihydro trioxide trihydrate)
Mathesiusite (mathesiusite: IMA2013-046) 7.DG.  [no] [no] (IUPAC: pentapotassium tetrauranyl tetrasulfate (vanadium pentaoxide) tetrawater)
Mathewrogersite (IMA1984-042) 9.CJ.55   
Mathiasite (crichtonite: IMA1982-087) 4.CC.40   
Matildite (IMA1982 s.p., 1883) 2.JA.20    (IUPAC: silver disulfa bismuthide)
Matioliite (dufrenite: IMA2005-011) 8.DK.15   [no] (IUPAC: sodium magnesium pentaluminium hexahydro tetraphosphate dihydrate)
Matlockite (matlockite: 1851) 3.DC.25    (IUPAC: lead chloride fluoride)
Matsubaraite (chevkinite: IMA2000-027) 9.BE.70   [no] (IUPAC: tetrastrontium pentatitanium octaoxy di(heptaoxodisilicate))
Mattagamite (marcasite: IMA1972-003) 2.EB.10a    (IUPAC: cobalt ditelluride)
Matteuccite (Y: 1950) 7.CD.05    (IUPAC: sodium hydroxosulfate monohydrate)
Mattheddleite (apatite, tritomite: IMA1985-019) 9.AH.25    (Pb5(SiO4)1.5(SO4)1.5Cl)
Matthiasweilite (IMA2021-069)  [no] [no]
Matulaite (IMA1977-013 Rd) 8.DK.30    (IUPAC: iron(III) heptaluminium octahydro tetraphosphate di(hydroxophosphate) octawater octahydrate)
Matyhite (whitlockite: IMA2015-121) 8.0  [no] [no] (Ca9(Ca0.5☐0.5)Fe2+(PO4)7)
Maucherite (metalloid alloy: 1913) 2.AB.15    (IUPAC: undecanickel octarsenide) 
Mauriziodiniite (lucabindiite: IMA2019-036) 4.0  [no] [no] (IUPAC: ammonio iodo di(diarsenic trioxide))
Mavlyanovite (silicide: IMA2008-026) 1.BB.05    (IUPAC: pentamanganese trisilicide)
Mawbyite (tsumcorite: IMA1988-049) 8.CG.15    (IUPAC: lead diiron(III) dihydro diarsenate)
Mawsonite (IMA1964-030) 2.CB.20    (IUPAC: hexacopper diiron tin octasulfide)
Maxwellite (titanite: IMA1987-044) 8.BH.10    (IUPAC: sodium iron(III) fluoro arsenate)
Mayingite (pyrite: IMA1993-016) 2.EB.25    (IUPAC: iridium bismuthide telluride)
Mazzettiite (petrovicite: IMA2004-003) 2.LB.40    (IUPAC: trisilver mercury lead antimonide pentatelluride)
Mazzite (zeolitic tectosilicate) 9.GC.20
Mazzite-Mg (IMA1973-045) 9.GC.20   
Mazzite-Na (IMA2003-058) 9.GC.20   [no]

Mb – Me 
Mbobomkulite (chalcoalumite: IMA1979-078) 5.ND.10   
Mcallisterite (IMA1963-012) 6.FA.10   
Mcalpineite (tellurium oxysalt: IMA1992-025) 7.DE.55    (IUPAC: tricopper tellurium(VI) hexaoxide)
Mcauslanite (IMA1986-051) 8.DB.60    (IUPAC: triiron(II) dialuminium fluoro triphosphate hydroxophosphate octadecahydrate)
Mcbirneyite (howardevansite: IMA1985-007) 8.AB.35    (IUPAC: tricopper divanadate)
Mcconnellite (IMA1967-037) 4.AB.15    (IUPAC: copper(I) chromium(III) dioxide)
Mccrillisite (IMA1991-023) 8.CA.20   
Mcgillite (pyrosmalite: IMA1979-024) 9.EE.10   
Mcgovernite (hematolite: 1927) 8.BE.45   
Mcguinnessite (malachite: IMA1977-027) 5.BA.10    (IUPAC: copper magnesium dihydro carbonate)
Mckelveyite-(Y) (IMA1964-025 Rd) 5.CC.05   
Mckinstryite (IMA1966-012) 2.BA.40    (IUPAC: pentasilver tricopper tetrasulfide)
Mcnearite (IMA1980-017) 8.CJ.55    (IUPAC: sodium pentacalcium arsenate tetra(hydroxoarsenate) tetrahydrate)
Medaite (medaite: IMA1979-062) 9.BJ.30    (IUPAC: hexamanganese(II) vanadatopentasilicate octadecaoxy hydroxyl)
Medenbachite (IMA1993-048) 8.BK.10    (IUPAC: dibismuth iron(III) copper(II) trihydro oxo diarsenate)
Medvedevite (IMA2021-082)
Meerschautite (IMA2013-061) 2.0  [no] [no]
Megacyclite (IMA1991-015) 9.CP.10   
Megakalsilite (feldspathoid, nepheline: IMA2001-008) 9.FA.05   [no] (IUPAC: potassium aluminium tetraoxosilicate)
Megawite (perovskite, perovskite: IMA2009-090) 4.CC.30  [no]  (IUPAC: calcium tin trioxide)
Meieranite (nordite: IMA2015-009) 9.0  [no] [no]
Meierite (zeolitic tectosilicate: IMA2014-039) 9.G  [no] [no]
Meifuite (IMA2019-101) 9.E  [no] [no]
Meionite (scapolite: 1801) 9.FB.15   
Meisserite (IMA2013-039) 7.0  [no]  (IUPAC: pentasodium uranyl trisulfate hydrogen sulfate (H2O))
Meitnerite (johannite: IMA2017-065) 7.0  [no] [no]
Meixnerite (hydrotalcite: IMA1974-003) 4.FL.05    (IUPAC: hexamagnesium dialuminium octadecahydroxide tetrahydrate)
Mejillonesite (IMA2010-068) 8.D0.  [no] [no] (IUPAC: sodium dimagnesium tetrahydro hydroxophosphate phosphate monohydrate)
Melanarsite (IMA2014-048) 8.0  [no] [no] (IUPAC: tripotassium heptacopper iron(III) tetraoxo tetrarsenate)
Melanocerite-(Ce)Q (apatite: 1887, 1890) 9.AJ.20    (Note: might be tritomite-(Ce)) 
Melanophlogite (IMA1962 s.p. Rd) 4.DA.25   
Melanostibite (corundum: IMA1971 s.p., 1893) 4.CB.05   
Melanotekite (Y: 1880) 9.BE.80    (IUPAC: dilead diiron(III) dioxo heptaoxodisilicate)
Melanothallite (Y: 1870) 3.DA.05    (IUPAC: dicopper oxo dichloride)
Melanovanadite (Y: 1921) 4.HE.05    (IUPAC: calcium divanadium(IV) divanadium(V) decaoxide pentahydrate)
Melansonite (rhodesite: IMA2018-168) 9.E  [no] [no]
Melanterite (melanterite: 1557) 7.CB.35    (IUPAC: iron(II) sulfate heptahydrate)
Melcherite (polyoxometalate: IMA2015-018) 4.0  [no] [no]
(Melilite sorosilicate group (Y: 1796) 09.BB.10) (Definition: tetragonal crystal system sorosilicates, with (XSiO7)−6, where X is Si, Al or B)
Meliphanite (Y: 1852) 9.DP.05   
Melkovite (betpakdalite: IMA1968-033) 8.DM.15   
Melliniite (phosphide: IMA2005-027) 1.BD.20   [no] (IUPAC: tetra(nickel,iron) phosphide)
Mellite (Y: 1793) 10.AC.05    (IUPAC: aluminium benzene hexacarboxylate hexadecahydrate)
Mellizinkalite (IMA2014-010) 3.0  [no] [no] (IUPAC: tripotassium dizinc heptachloride)
Melonite (Y: 1868) 2.EA.20    (IUPAC: nickel ditelluride)
Mélonjosephite (IMA1973-012) 8.BG.10    (IUPAC: calcium iron(II) iron(III) hydro diphosphate)
Menchettiite (lillianite: IMA2011-009) 2.0  [no]  (Pb5Mn3Ag2Sb6As4S24)
Mendeleevite 9.??.
Mendeleevite-(Ce) (IMA2009-092) 9.  [no] 
Mendeleevite-(Nd) (IMA2015-031) 9.  [no] 
Mendigite (wollastonite: IMA2014-007) 9.  [no] [no]
Mendipite (Y: 1824) 3.DC.70    (IUPAC: trilead dioxo dichloride)
Mendozavilite (betpakdalite) 7.GB.
Mendozavilite-KCa (IMA2011-088) 7.GB.  [no] [no]  
Mendozavilite-NaCu (IMA2011-039) 7.GB.  [no] [no] 
Mendozavilite-NaFe (IMA2010-E, IMA1982-009) 7.GB.45   
Mendozite (Y: 1868) 7.CC.15    (IUPAC: sodium aluminium disulfate undecahydrate)
Meneghinite (meneghinite: 1852) 2.HB.05b    (Pb13CuSb7S24)
Menezesite (polyoxometalate: IMA2005-023) 4.FN.05   [no]
Mengeite (IMA2018-035) 8.0  [no] [no]
Mengxianminite (IMA2015-070) 4.0  [no] [no]
Meniaylovite (IMA2002-050) 3.CG.10   [no] (IUPAC: tetracalcium fluoro[sulfate hexafluorosilicate (hexafluoroaluminate)] dodecahydrate)
Menshikovite (IMA1993-057) 2.AC.20c    (IUPAC: tripalladium dinickel triarsenide)
Menzerite-(Y) (garnet, garnet: IMA2009-050) 9.AD.  [no]  (IUPAC: diyttrium calcium dimagnesium tri(tetraoxysilicate))
Mercallite (Y: 1935) 7.AD.10    (IUPAC: potassium hydroxosulfate)
Mercury (solid as mineral) (liquid as mineraloid) 
Mereheadite (IMA1996-045) 3.DC.45   
Mereiterite (IMA1993-045) 7.CC.55    (IUPAC: dipotassium iron(II) disulfate tetrahydrate)
Merelaniite (cylindrite: IMA2016-042) 2.0  [no] [no]
Merenskyite (melonite: IMA1965-016) 2.EA.20    (IUPAC: palladium ditelluride)
Meridianiite (IMA2007-011) 7.CB.90   [no] (IUPAC: magnesium sulfate undecahydrate)
Merlinoite (zeolitic tectosilicate: IMA1976-046) 9.GC.15   
Merrihueite (milarite: IMA1965-020) 9.CM.05   
Merrillite (whitlockite: IMA1976-K, 1917 Rd) 8.AC.45   [no] (IUPAC: nonacalcium sodium magnesium heptaphosphate)
Mertieite 2.AC.1?
Mertieite-I (IMA1971-016 Rd) 2.AC.15b   
Mertieite-II (stillwaterite: 1973) 2.AC.10b   
Merwinite (Y: 1921) 9.AD.15    (IUPAC: tricalcium magnesium di(tetraoxysilicate))
Mesaite (IMA2015-069) 4.0  [no] [no]
Mesolite (zeolitic tectosilicate: IMA1997 s.p., 1813) 9.GA.05   
Messelite (fairfieldite: 1890) 8.CG.05    (IUPAC: dicalcium iron(II) diphosphate dihydrate)
Meta-aluminite (aluminite: IMA1967-013) 7.DC.05    (IUPAC: dialuminium tetrahydro sulfate pentahydrate)
Meta-alunogenQ (Y: 1942) 7.CB.45  [no] 
Meta-ankoleite (natroautunite: IMA1963-013) 8.EB.15    (IUPAC: potassium uranyl phosphate trihydrate)
Meta-autunite (meta-autunite: 1904) 8.EB.10    (IUPAC: calcium diuranyl diphosphate hexahydrate)
Metaborite (IMA1967 s.p., 1964) 6.GD.10   
Metacalciouranoite (wolsendorfite: IMA1971-054) 4.GB.20   
Metacinnabar (sphalerite: 1870) 2.CB.05a    (IUPAC: mercury sulfide)
Metadelrioite (IMA1967-006) 4.HG.40    (IUPAC: strontium calcium dihydro divanadate)
Metahaiweeite (IMA1962 s.p., 1959) 9.AK.25   [no]
Metaheinrichite (8.EB.: 1958) 8.EB.10    (IUPAC: barium diuranyl diarsenate octahydrate)
Metahewettite (hewettite: 1914) 4.HE.15    (IUPAC: calcium hexavanadium(V) hexadecaoxide trihydrate)
Metahohmannite (amarantite: 1938) 7.DB.30    (IUPAC: diiron(III) oxo disulfate tetrahydrate)
Metakahlerite (8.EB.: 1958) 8.EB.10    (IUPAC: iron(II) diuranyl diarsenate octahydrate)
Metakirchheimerite (8.EB.: 1958) 8.EB.10    (IUPAC: cobalt diuranyl diarsenate octahydrate)
Metaköttigite (symplesite: IMA1979-077) 8.CE.85   
Metalodèvite (IMA1972-014) 8.ED.10    (IUPAC: zinc diuranyl diarsenate decahydrate)
Metamunirite (IMA1990-044) 4.HD.20    (IUPAC: sodium vanadate(V))
Metanatroautunite (IMA1987-C, 1957) 8.0    (IUPAC: sodium uranyl phosphate trihydrate)
Metanováčekite (8.EB.: IMA2007 s.p., 1964) 8.EB.10    (IUPAC: magnesium diuranyl diarsenate octahydrate)
Metarauchite (autunite: IMA2008-050) 8.EB.05    (IUPAC: nickel diuranyl diarsenate octahydrate)
Metarossite (Y: 1927) 4.HD.10    (IUPAC: calcium divanadium(V) hexaoxide dihydrate)
Metasaléeite (8.EB.: 1950) 8.EB.10  [no] [no] (IUPAC: magnesium diuranyl diphosphate octahydrate)
Metaschoderite (IMA1962 s.p.) 8.CE.70    (IUPAC: aluminium phosphate trihydrate)
Metaschoepite (Y: 1960) 4.GA.05    (IUPAC: octauranyl dioxo dodecahydroxide decahydrate)
Metasideronatrite (Y: 1938) 7.DF.20    (IUPAC: tetrasodium diiron dihydro tetrasulfate dihydrate)
Metastibnite (stibnite: 1888) 2.DB.05    (IUPAC: diantimony trisulfide)
Metastudtite (IMA1981-055) 4.GA.15    (IUPAC: uranyl dioxide dihydrate)
Metaswitzerite (IMA1981-027a, 1967 Rd) 8.CE.25    (IUPAC: trimanganese(II) diphosphate tetrahydrate)
Metatamboite (tellurite: IMA2016-060) 4.0  [no] [no]
Metathénardite (IMA2015-102) 7.AC.30  [no] [no] (IUPAC: disodium sulfate)
Metatorbernite (8.EB.: 1916) 8.EB.10    (IUPAC: copper diuranyl diphosphate octahydrate)
Metatyuyamunite (fritzscheite: 1954) 4.HB.25    (IUPAC: calcium diuranyl divanadate trihydrate)
MetauramphiteQ (8.EB.: 1957) 8.EB.  [no] [no]
Metauranocircite I (8.EB.: IMA2007 s.p., 1904) 8.EB.10    (IUPAC: barium diuranyl diphosphate octahydrate)
Metauranopilite (IMA2007 s.p., 1951) 7.EA.05    (IUPAC: hexauranyl decahydro sulfate pentahydrate)
Metauranospinite (8.EB.: IMA2007 s.p., 1958) 8.EB.10    (IUPAC: calcium diuranyl diarsenate octahydrate)
Metauroxite (hydrous uranyl oxalate: IMA2019-030) 10.0  [no] [no]
Metavandendriesscheite (Y: 1960) 4.GB.40   
Metavanmeersscheite (IMA1981-010) 8.EC.20    (IUPAC: uranium(VI) triuranyl hexahydro diphosphate dihydrate)
Metavanuralite (IMA1970-003) 4.HB.20    (IUPAC: aluminium diuranyl hydro divanadate octahydrate)
Metavariscite (phosphosiderite: IMA1967 s.p., 1925) 8.CD.05    (IUPAC: aluminium phosphate dihydrate)
Metavauxite (Y: 1927) 8.DC.25   (IUPAC: iron(II) dialuminium dihydro diphosphate octahydrate)
Metavivianite (symplesite: IMA1973-049) 8.DC.25    (IUPAC: iron(II) diiron(III) dihydro diphosphate hexahydrate)
Metavoltine (metavoltine: 1883) 7.DF.35   
Metazellerite (IMA1965-032) 5.EC.10    (IUPAC: copper uranyl dicarbonate trihydrate)
Metazeunerite (8.EB.: 1937) 8.EB.10    (IUPAC: copper diuranyl diarsenate octahydrate)
Meurigite (phosphofibrite) 8.DJ.20
Meurigite-K (IMA1995-022) 8.DJ.20   
Meurigite-Na (IMA2007-024) 8.DJ.20   [no]
Meyerhofferite (Y: 1914) 6.CA.30    (IUPAC: calcium pentahydro trioxo triborate hydrate)
Meymacite (IMA1965-001a Rd) 4.FJ.05    (IUPAC: tungsten trioxide dihydrate)
Meyrowitzite (IMA2018-039) 5.0  [no] [no] (IUPAC: calcium uranyl dicarbonate pentahydrate)

Mg – Mu 
Mgriite (IMA1980-100) 2.LA.45   
Mianningite (crichtonite: IMA2014-072) 4.0  [no] [no]
Miargyrite (Y: 1829) 2.HA.10    (IUPAC: silver antimonide disulfide)
Miassite (IMA1997-029) 2.BC.05   [no] (IUPAC: heptadecarhodium pentadecasulfide)
Michalskiite (IMA2019-062) 8.0  [no] [no]
Micheelsenite (ettringite: IMA1999-033) 8.DO.30   
Michenerite (ullmannite: IMA1971-006a Rd) 2.EB.25    (IUPAC: palladium bismuthide telluride)
Microcline (feldspar: 1830) 9.FA.30   
(microlite group (tantalum dominant), pyrochlore supergroup )
Microsommite (cancrinite: 1872) 9.FB.05   
Middendorfite (IMA2005-028) 9.EJ.10   
Middlebackite (IMA2015-115) 10.0  [no] [no]
Mieite-(Y) (IMA2014-020) 9.AG.25  [no] 
Miersite (sphalerite: 1898) 3.AA.05   
Miessiite (isomertieite: IMA2006-013) 2.AC.15a   [no] (IUPAC: undecapalladium ditelluride disulfide)
Miguelromeroite (hureaulite: IMA2008-066) 8.CB.10  [no] [no] (IUPAC: pentamanganese diarsenate dihydroxoarsenate tetrahydrate)
Miharaite (IMA1976-012) 2.LB.05    (IUPAC: lead tetracopper iron bismuthide hexasulfide)
Mikasaite (millosevichite: IMA1992-015) 7.AB.05    (IUPAC: diiron(III) trisulfate)
Mikecoxite (IMA2021-060)  [no] [no]
Mikehowardite (IMA2020-068) 4.0  [no] [no]
Milanriederite (vesuvianite: IMA2018-041) 9.B  [no] [no]
Milarite (milarite: 1870) 9.CM.05   
Milkovoite (IMA2021-005)  [no] [no] (IUPAC: tetracopper oxophosphate arsenate)
Millerite (millerite: 1845) 2.CC.20    (IUPAC: nickel sulfide)
Millisite (wardite: 1930) 8.DL.10    (IUPAC: sodium calcium hexaluminium nonahydro tetraphosphate trihydrate)
Millosevichite (millosevichite: 1913) 7.AB.05    (IUPAC: dialuminium trisulfate)
Millsite (IMA2015-086) 4.0  [no] [no] (IUPAC: copper tellurite dihydrate)
Milotaite (ullmannite: IMA2003-056) 2.EB.25    (IUPAC: lead antimony selenide)
Mimetite (apatite: 1832) 8.BN.05    (IUPAC: pentalead chloro triarsenate)
Minakawaite (modderite: IMA2019-024) 2.0  [no] [no] (IUPAC: rhodium antimonide)
Minasgeraisite-(Y) (gadolinite: IMA1983-090) 9.AJ.20   
Minasragrite (minasragrite: 1915) 7.DB.20    (IUPAC: vanadium(IV) oxo sulfate pentahydrate)
Mineevite-(Y) (IMA1991-048) 5.BF.25   
Minehillite (gyrolite: IMA1983-001) 9.EE.75   
Minguzzite (oxalate: 1955) 10.AB.25    (IUPAC: tripotassium iron(III) trioxalate trihydrate)
Minium (Y: 1806) 4.BD.05    (IUPAC: dilead(II) lead(IV) tetraoxide)
Minjiangite (dmisteinbergite: IMA2013-021) 8.0  [no] [no]
Minnesotaite (talc: 1944) 9.EC.05   
Minohlite (IMA2012-035) 7.0  [no] [no]
Minrecordite (dolomite: IMA1980-096) 5.AB.10    (IUPAC: calcium zinc dicarbonate)
Minyulite (Y: 1932) 8.DH.05    (IUPAC: potassium dialuminium fluoro diphosphate tetrahydrate)
Mirabilite (Y: 1845) 7.CD.10    (IUPAC: sodium sulfate decahydrate)
Mirnyite (crichtonite: IMA2018-144a) [no] [no]
Misakiite (atacamite: IMA2013-131) 4.0  [no] [no] (IUPAC: tricopper manganese hexahydroxide dichloride)
Misenite (Y: 1849) 7.AD.15    (IUPAC: octapotassium sulfate hexahydroxosulfate)
Miserite (Y: 1950) 9.DG.85   
Mitridatite (arseniosiderite: 1914) 8.DH.30    (IUPAC: dicalcium triiron(III) dioxo triphosphate trihydrate)
Mitrofanovite (IMA2017-112) 2.0  [no] [no]
Mitryaevaite (IMA1991-035) 8.DB.25   
Mitscherlichite (Y: 1925) 3.CJ.15    (IUPAC: dipotassium copper tetrachloride dihydrate)
Mixite (mixite: 1880) 8.DL.15    (IUPAC: hexacopper(II) bismuth hexahydro triarsenate trihydrate)
Miyahisaite (apatite: IMA2011-043) 8.BN.05  [no] 
Moabite (IMA2020-092)  [no] [no]
Moctezumite (uranyl tellurite: IMA1965-004) 4.JK.65    (IUPAC: lead uranyl ditellurite(IV))
Modderite (modderite: 1923) 2.CC.15    (IUPAC: cobalt arsenide)
Moëloite (IMA1998-045) 2.HC.25   [no] (IUPAC: hexalead hexaantimonide heptadecasulfide)
Mogánite (IMA1999-035) 4.DA.20   [no] (IUPAC: silicon oxide (n)hydrate)
Mogovidite (eudialyte: IMA2004-040) 9.CO.10   
Mohite (IMA1981-015) 2.CB.15b    (IUPAC: dicopper trisulfa stannide)
Möhnite (aphthitalite: IMA2014-101) 7.0  [no] [no] (IUPAC: ammonium dipotassium sodium disulfate) 
Mohrite (picromerite: IMA1964-023) 7.CC.60    (IUPAC: diammonium iron(II) sulfate hexahydrate)
Moissanite (carbide: 1905) 1.DA.    (IUPAC: silicon carbide, 'carborundum')
Mojaveite (tellurium oxysalt: IMA2013-120) 7.A?.  [no] [no] (Cu6[Te6+O4(OH)2](OH)7Cl)
Molinelloite (IMA2016-055) 8.0  [no] [no]
Moluranite (Y: 1957) 7.HA.15    (IUPAC: tetrahydrogen uranium(IV) triuranyl heptamolybdate octadecahydrate)
Molybdenite (molybdenite: 1796) 2.EA.30    (IUPAC: molybdenum sulfide) 
Molybdite (IMA1963 s.p., 1907 Rd) 4.E    (IUPAC: molybdenum trioxide)
Molybdofornacite (fornacite: IMA1982-062) 7.FC.10    (IUPAC: copper dilead hydro molybdate arsenate)
Molybdomenite (IMA2007 s.p., 1882) 4.JF.05    (IUPAC: lead selenite)
Molybdophyllite (molybdophyllite: 1901) 9.HH.25   
Molysite (Y: 1868) 3.AC.10    (IUPAC: iron(III) trichloride)
Momoiite (garnet, garnet: IMA2009-026) 9.AD.25  [no] 
Monazite 8.AD.50 (IUPAC: REE phosphate)
Monazite-(Ce) (IMA1987 s.p., 1829) 8.AD.50   
Monazite-(La) (IMA1966 s.p.) 8.AD.50   
Monazite-(Nd) (IMA1986-052) 8.AD.50   
Monazite-(Sm) (IMA2001-001) 8.AD.50   [no]
Moncheite (melonite: IMA1967 s.p., 1963) 2.EA.20   
Monchetundraite (IMA2019-020) 2.0  [no] [no] (IUPAC: dipalladium nickel ditelluride)
Monetite (Y: 1882) 8.AD.10    (IUPAC: calcium hydroxophosphate)
Mongolite (IMA1983-027) 9.HF.05   
MonimoliteQ (pyrochlore: IMA2013 s.p., 1865) 4.DH.20    Note: possibly  oxyplumboroméite (Hålenius & Bosi, 2013).
Monipite (barringerite: IMA2007-033) 1.BD.10    (IUPAC: molybdenum nickel phosphide)
Monohydrocalcite (Y: 1964) 5.CB.20    (IUPAC: calcium carbonate monohydrate)
MontaniteQ (tellurium oxysalt: 1868) 7.CD.60    (IUPAC: dibismuth(III) tellurium(VI) hexaoxide dihydrate)
Montbrayite (IMA2017-F, 1946) 2.DB.20   
Montdorite (mica: IMA1998 s.p., 1979 Rd) 9.EC.15   [no]
Montebrasite (titanite, amblygonite: 1872) 8.BB.05    (IUPAC: lithium aluminium hydro phosphate)
Monteneveite (garnet: IMA2018-060) 4.0  [no] [no]
Monteponite (rocksalt, periclase: 1901) 4.AB.25    (IUPAC: cadmium(II) oxide)
Monteregianite-(Y) (rhodesite: IMA1972-026) 9.EB.15   
Montesommaite (zeolitic tectosilicate: IMA1988-038) 9.GB.30   
Montetrisaite (IMA2007-009) 7.DD.85    (IUPAC: hexacopper decahydro sulfate dihydrate)
Montgomeryite (calcioferrite: 1940) 8.DH.25    (IUPAC: tetracalcium magnesium tetraluminium tetrahydro hexaphosphate dodecahydrate)
Monticellite (olivine: 1831) 9.AC.10    (IUPAC: calcium magnesium (tetraoxy silicate))
Montmorillonite (montmorillonite, smectite: 1847) 9.EC.40   
Montroseite ("O(OH)" group: 1953) 4.FD.10   
Montroyalite (IMA1985-001) 5.DB.10    (IUPAC: tetrastrontium octaaluminium tricarbonate hexacosahydroxide decahydrate)
Montroydite (Y: 1903) 4.AC.15    (IUPAC: mercury oxide)
Mooihoekite (chalcopyrite: IMA1971-019) 2.CB.10b    (IUPAC: nonacopper nonairon hexadecasulfide)
Moolooite (oxalate: IMA1980-082) 10.AB.15   
Mooreite (Y: 1929) 7.DD.45    (IUPAC: pentadecamagnesium hexacosahydro disulfate octahydrate) 
Moorhouseite (hexahydrite: IMA1963-008) 7.CB.25    (IUPAC: cobalt sulfate hexahydrate)
Mopungite (perovskite, stottite: IMA1982-020) 4.FC.15    (IUPAC: sodium antimony(V) hexahydroxide)
Moraesite (Y: 1953) 8.DA.05    (IUPAC: diberyllium hydro phosphate tetrahydrate)
Moraskoite (moraskoite: IMA2013-084) 8.0  [no] [no] (IUPAC: disodium magnesium fluoro phosphate)
Mordenite (zeolitic tectosilicate: IMA1997 s.p., 1864) 9.GD.35   
Moreauite (IMA1984-010) 8.ED.05    (IUPAC: trialuminium uranyl dihydro triphosphate tridecahydrate)
Morelandite (apatite: IMA1977-035) 8.BN.05    (IUPAC: dicalcium tribarium chloro triarsenate)
Morenosite (epsomite: 1851) 7.CB.40    (IUPAC: nickel sulfate heptahydrate)
Morimotoite (garnet, garnet: IMA1992-017) 9.AD.25   [no]
Morinite (IMA1967 s.p., 1891) 8.DM.05    (IUPAC: sodium dicalcium dialuminium hydroxo tetrafluoro diphosphate dihydrate)
Morozeviczite (IMA1974-036) 2.CB.35a   
Morrisonite (polyoxometalate: IMA2014-088) 4.0  [no] [no]
Mosandrite-(Ce) (seidozerite, rinkite: IMA2016-A, IMA2009-C, IMA2007 s.p., 1842 Rd) 9.BE.20   [no]
Moschelite (IMA1987-038) 3.AA.30    (IUPAC: dimercury diiodide)
Moschellandsbergite (amalgam: 1938) 1.AD.15d    (IUPAC: disilver trimercury amalgam)
Mosesite (Y: 1910) 3.DD.30   
Moskvinite-(Y) (IMA2002-031) 9.CD.05    (IUPAC: disodium potassium yttrium pentadecaoxy hexasilicate)
Mössbauerite (hydrotalcite: IMA2012-049) 4.0  [no] [no] (IUPAC: hexairon(III) tetraoxo octahydroxide carbonate trihydrate)
Mottanaite-(Ce) (hellandite: IMA2018-D, IMA2001-020) 9.DK.20   [no]
Mottramite (decloizite: 1876) 8.BH.40    (IUPAC: lead copper hydro vanadate)
MotukoreaiteQ (hydrotalcite, woodwardite: IMA1976-033) 7.DD.35   
Mounanaite (tsumcorite: IMA1968-031) 8.CG.15    (IUPAC: lead diiron(III) dihydro divanadate)
Mountainite (Y: 1957) 9.GG.10   
Mountkeithite (hydrotalcite, woodwardite: IMA1980-038) 7.DD.35   
Mourite (IMA1967 s.p., 1962) 4.FL.80    (IUPAC: uranyl pentamolybdenum(VI) hexadecaoxide pentahydrate)
Moxuanxueite (woehlerite: IMA2019-100) 9.BE.  [no] [no]
Moydite-(Y) (IMA1985-025) 6.AC.45    (IUPAC: yttrium tetrahydro borate carbonate)
Mozartite (adelite: IMA1991-016) 9.AG.60    (IUPAC: calcium manganese(III) tetraoxysilicate hydroxyl)
Mozgovaite (IMA1998-060) 2.JA.05h   
Mpororoite (anthoinite: IMA1970-037) 7.GB.35    (IUPAC: dialuminium oxo ditungstate hexahydrate)
Mrázekite (IMA1990-045) 8.DJ.40   
Mroseite (IMA1974-032) 4.JL.15    (IUPAC: calcium tellurium(IV) dioxocarbonate)
Mückeite (IMA1988-018) 2.GA.25    (IUPAC: copper nickel bismuth trisulfide)
Muirite (IMA1964-013) 9.CN.05   
Mukhinite (epidote, clinozoisite: IMA1968-035) 9.BG.05a   
Müllerite (tellurium oxysalt: IMA2019-060) 8.0  [no] [no]
Mullite (Y: 1924) 9.AF.20   
Mummeite (pavonite: IMA1986-025) 2.JA.05f   
Munakataite (linarite: IMA2007-012) 7.BC.65    (IUPAC: dilead dicopper tetrahydro selenite sulfate)
Mundite (IMA1980-075) 8.EC.30    (IUPAC: aluminium triuranyl trihydro diphosphate (5.5)hydrate)
Mundrabillaite (IMA1978-058) 8.CJ.10    (IUPAC: diammonium calcium dihydroxophosphate monohydrate)
Munirite (IMA1982-038) 4.HD.15    (IUPAC: sodium vanadium(V) trioxide (1.9)hydrate)
Murakamiite (pectolite: IMA2016-066) 9.D?.  [no] [no]
Murashkoite (phosphide: IMA2012-071) 1.0  [no] [no] (IUPAC: iron phosphide)
Murataite-(Y) (IMA1972-007) 4.DF.15   
Murchisite (IMA2010-003) 2.0  [no] [no] (IUPAC: pentachromium hexasulfide)
Murdochite (murdochite: 1955) 3.DB.45    (IUPAC: dodecacopper dilead pentadecaoxo dichloride)
Murmanite (seidozerite, murmanite: 1930) 9.BE.27    (IUPAC: disodium dititanium (heptaoxy disilicate) dioxy dihydrate)
Murphyite (raspite: IMA2021-107) 7.AD.  [no] [no]
Murunskite (IMA1980-064) 2.BD.30   
Muscovite (mica: IMA1998 s.p., 1794) 9.EC.15    (IUPAC: potassium dialuminium (aluminotrisilicate) decaoxydihydroxyl)
Museumite (IMA2003-039) 2.HB.20c   
Mushistonite (perovskite, schoenfliesite: IMA1982-068) 4.FC.10    (IUPAC: copper(II) tin(IV) hexahydroxide)
MuskoxiteQ (hydrotalcite: IMA1967-043) 4.FL.05    (IUPAC: heptamagnesium tetrairon(III) hexacosahydroxide monohydrate)
Muthmannite (Y: 1911) 2.CB.85    (IUPAC: gold silver ditelluride)
Mutinaite (zeolitic tectosilicate: IMA1996-025) 9.GF.35   [no]
Mutnovskite (IMA2004-032) 2.GC.50   [no] (IUPAC: dilead iodo arsenide trisulfide)

External links
IMA Database of Mineral Properties/ RRUFF Project
Mindat.org - The Mineral Database
Webmineral.com
Mineralatlas.eu minerals M